The Government Engineering College Thrissur (GEC-T) is a public engineering and research institute located in Thrissur, Kerala, India. During its establishment in 1957, it was the second-oldest public engineering institute to be established in the state of Kerala after CET (1939) and the first public institute of technology to be established after the formation of the state in 1956. The institute is affiliated to the APJ Abdul Kalam Technological University (KTU) since its inception in 2015.

History
The institute was originally located at the Chembukkavu campus of the Maharaja's Technological Institute in 1957. The foundation stone of the institute was laid by the late Pandit Jawarharlal Nehru, the first Prime Minister of India, on 26 April 1958. The institute was shifted into its present campus in October 1960. The institute was formally inaugurated by late Pattom A. Thanu Pillai, former Chief Minister of Kerala, on 2 February 1962.

Besides the regular B-Tech courses, the institute also offers a postgraduate Course in Computer Applications (MCA), and postgraduate programmes in other subjects. Courses offered by the institute have been accredited by the National Board of Accreditation, AICTE, and Council of Architecture (B.Arch).

Organisation and administration

Departments
 Dept. of Electronics and Communication Engineering 
 Dept. of Mechanical Engineering
 Dept. of Civil Engineering
 Dept. of Electrical and Electronics Engineering
 Dept. of Chemical Engineering
 Dept. of Production Engineering
 Dept. of Computer Science and Engineering
 School of Architecture and Planning
 Dept. of MCA
 Environmental Centre
 Dept. of Mathematics
 Dept. of Physics
 Dept. of Chemistry
 Dept. of Economics
 Dept. of Physical Education

Ancillaries and facilities
 Central Library
 Central Computing Centre 
 Nodal Center for Robotics and Automation
 Gymnasium
 Canteen
 Post Office
 State Bank of India ATM
 Placement Cell
 Dispensary
 Millenium (Main) auditorium
 Open air theatre
 Amphitheatres
 Men's Hostels
 Ladies Hostels
 Staff Quarters

Academics

Academic programmes 
The following undergraduate programmes are offered. Admission to these programs is based on the applicant's results of the entrance tests conducted by the Commissionerate of Entrance Examinations, Kerala.

B.Tech Programmes
 Electronics and Communication Engineering
 Mechanical Engineering
 Civil Engineering
 Electrical and Electronics Engineering
 Chemical Engineering
 Production Engineering 
 Computer Science and Engineering
 Architecture (B.Arch)

PG programmes
 MCA 
 M.Tech. in Environmental Engineering (Civil)
 M.Tech. in Structural Engineering (Civil)
 M.Tech. in Water Resources and Hydro Informatics (Civil)
 M.Tech. in Computer Science and Engineering
 M.Tech. in Production Engineering (Mech)
 M.Tech. in IC Engines and Turbo Machinery (Mech)
 M.Tech. in Industrial Engineering (Mech)
 M.Tech. in Power Electronics (EEE)
 M.Tech. in Power Systems Engineering (EEE)
 M.Tech. in Process Control (Chemical)
 M.Tech. in Manufacturing Systems Management (Production)
 M.Tech. in Communication Engineering and Signal Processing (ECE)
 M.Plan in Urban Planning (Architecture)

Ph.D programmes
 Mechanical Engineering
 Electrical and Electronics Engineering
 Chemical Engineering.
 Civil Engineering

Sports
 Football and cricket stadium 
 Racing tracks with galleries
 Basketball, volleyball and tennis courts
 Hockey ground and pavilion
 Indoor badminton stadium
 Indoor table tennis hall

Teams Sent For University Games
Cricket Team
Football Team
Basketball Team
Volleyball Team
Handball Team
Netball Team
Softball Team 
Athletics Team
Badminton Team
Table tennis Team

Rankings

The National Institutional Ranking Framework (NIRF) ranked it 156 among the engineering institutes of India in 2021.

Student life
The College Union conducts the annual National Level Tech fest Dyuthi which includes technical, cultural as well as sporting events.

A TEDx event was organised by students of GEC, Thrissur in April 2018. The theme of the event was "Reality Check". This was the first TEDx event in Central Kerala.

Notable alumni

 K. Radhakrishnan, Padmabhushan, Former Chairman, Indian Space Research Organisation
 Tessy Thomas, Head of Missile program Defence Research and Development Organisation
 M. Chandra Dathan, Padmashree, Former Director, Vikram Sarabhai Space Centre (VSSC)
 Babu Bharadwaj, writer and journalist
 T. G. Ravi, Malayalam film actor and MD of Suntec Tyres
 Anand Neelakantan, writer
 Sreekumaran Thampi, Lyricist, director, producer, screenwriter

External links
Institute Website  : http://gectcr.ac.in/

References

 
Engineering colleges in Thrissur
All India Council for Technical Education